Drysdale River is a river in the Kimberley region of Western Australia.

The river rises in the Caroline Ranges, flows in a northerly direction and discharges into Napier Broome Bay near Kalumburu. The river contains several permanent pools, some of which have several examples of Indigenous Australian art known as Bradshaw paintings that can be found along the cliff faces.

Notable waterfalls on the river are the Eagle Falls, which are regularly visited by Kimberley coastal cruise ships, Solea Falls north of the Johnston Creek fork, and Bango Falls on the tributary Bango Creek.

There are 19 tributaries of the Drysdale, including Gibb River, Woodhouse River, Barton River, Tadarida Creek, Wax Creek, Curlew Creek, King David Creek, Ubach Creek and Damper Creek.

15% of the river's catchment area lies within Drysdale River National Park.

The river was named after a director of the Victorian Squatting Company, Thomas Andrew Drysdale, by the company's surveyor Charles Burrowes, in 1886.

The traditional owners of the area that the river flows through are the Ngarinjin, Miwa and Wilawila peoples.

References 

Rivers of the Kimberley region of Western Australia